Daviesia debilior is a species of flowering plant in the family Fabaceae and is endemic to the south-west of Western Australia. It is a shrub with low-lying stems and many erect branchlets, scattered linear to scale-like phyllodes, and yellow, purplish, orange-pink and dark purplish flowers.

Description

Taxonomy and naming
Daviesia debilior was first formally described in 1982 by Michael Crisp in the journal Nuytsia from specimens collected by Charles Chapman near Eneabba in 1977. The specific epithet (debilior) means "weaker" or "more feeble", in comparison to the closely related Daviesia hakeoides.

In the same journal, Crisp described two subspecies and the names are accepted by the Australian Plant Census:
 Daviesia debilior Crisp subsp. debilior has gently upcurved branchlets and phyllodes, at least on the lower parts of the branchlets;
 Daviesia debilior subsp. sinuans Crisp has weakly upcurved, sinuous branchlets and all phyllodes reduced to minute scales.

Distribution and habitat
This species of pea grows in heath between Eneabba, Darlington and Wongan Hills in the Avon Wheatbelt, Geraldton Sandplains and Jarrah Forest biogeographic regions of south-western Western Australia. Subspecies sinuans has a more restricted distribution further inland than the autonym.

Conservation status
Subspecies debilior is classified as "Priority Two" by the Western Australian Government Department of Biodiversity, Conservation and Attractions, meaning that it is poorly known and from only one or a few locations, and subspecies sinuans "Priority Three" by the Government of Western Australia Department of Biodiversity, Conservation and Attractions, meaning that it is poorly known and known from only a few locations but is not under imminent threat.

References

debilior
Eudicots of Western Australia
Plants described in 1982
Taxa named by Michael Crisp